Los Lagos (Spanish meaning "The Lakes") may refer to:

Los Lagos Region, Chile
Los Lagos Department, Neuquén Province, Argentina
Los Lagos, Chile, a town and municipality in Los Rios Region